Clarendon Plantation House was a historic plantation house located about  west of Evergreen, Louisiana. The house was built in 1842 by Jonathan Koen, and was enlarged in 1890 with several minor changes to its structure.

The house was added to the National Register of Historic Places on May 9, 1985.

It was demolished in May 1991, and was delisted on July 22, 2016.

References

See also
National Register of Historic Places listings in Avoyelles Parish, Louisiana

Houses on the National Register of Historic Places in Louisiana
Plantation houses in Louisiana
Houses completed in 1842
Houses in Avoyelles Parish, Louisiana
National Register of Historic Places in Avoyelles Parish, Louisiana
Former National Register of Historic Places in Louisiana
Buildings and structures demolished in 1991
Demolished buildings and structures in Louisiana